"Coming Around" is a song by Scottish indie rock band Travis, released on 5 June 2000 as a stand-alone single, although it was subsequently added to a limited-edition Special Live Edition of The Man Who. The single peaked at number five on the UK Singles Chart and became the band's first number-one single on the Scottish Singles Chart. One of the single's B-sides is a cover of "The Weight", a song by the Band.

In 2012, American rock band Counting Crows recorded this song for their album Underwater Sunshine (or What We Did on Our Summer Vacation).

Track listings

 UK CD1
 "Coming Around"
 "Just the Faces Change"
 "The Connection"

 UK CD2
 "Coming Around"
 "Rock 'N' (Salad) Roll"
 "The Weight"

 UK 7-inch and cassette single
 "Coming Around"
 "The Connection"

 Japanese EP
 "Coming Around"
 "Just the Faces Change"
 "The Connection"
 "Rock 'N' (Salad) Roll"
 "The Weight"

Credits and personnel
Credits are taken from the UK CD1 liner notes.

Studios
 Produced at Roundhouse Studios and Eden Studios (London, England)
 Mixed at The Strongroom (London, England)

Personnel
 Fran Healy – writing
 Mark Wallis – production
 Travis – production
 Nigel Godrich – mixing
 Blue Source – art direction
 Bridget Smith – photography

Charts

References

2000 songs
2000 singles
Independiente (record label) singles
Number-one singles in Scotland
Songs written by Fran Healy (musician)
Travis (band) songs